BiblioPage.com is an Amazon.com affiliate site with a database of books gathered from libraries across the world using the NISO z39.50 protocol for accessing bibliographic databases. The website uses the YAZ toolkit from IndexData to access and manipulate bibliographic information. 

The website is used by libraries to choose the best selection of books. By suggesting titles that libraries have purchased, the consumer is choosing only among the most relevant titles.

Similar programs that make use of public z39.50 resources are Emc2Library.com or isbndb.com.

References

External links
Official Website
Library Of Congress WWW/z39.50 Gateway

Bibliographic databases and indexes
Book selling websites
Product searching websites